Anolis scypheus, the  yellow-tongued anole, is a species of lizard in the family Dactyloidae. The species is found in Colombia, Ecuador, Peru, and Brazil.

References

Anoles
Reptiles of Colombia
Reptiles of Ecuador
Reptiles of Peru
Reptiles of Brazil
Reptiles described in 1864
Taxa named by Edward Drinker Cope